O.H.P. Tanner House, locally known as the Old Courthouse, is a historic home located at La Crosse, Mecklenburg County, Virginia. It was built about 1769, and is a -story, 28-foot square, gambrel-roofed, double-pile Georgian style frame dwelling.  The house was remodeled about 1820, and a rear ell added about 1923.  It was moved to its present location in 2006, and a substantial rehabilitation was completed in 2009.

It was listed on the National Register of Historic Places in 2011.

References

Houses on the National Register of Historic Places in Virginia
Georgian architecture in Virginia
Houses completed in 1769
Houses in Mecklenburg County, Virginia
National Register of Historic Places in Mecklenburg County, Virginia